Bimenes is a municipality of Asturias, Spain. It borders with Siero, Nava, Laviana and San Martín del Rey Aurelio.

It is situated in the center zone of Asturias. Its capital is Martimporra. It is 32 km away from Oviedo and its main road is AS-25, that runs parallel to the Pra river.

The main towns of Bimenes are Martimporra, San Julian, Rozadas, Suares, Melendreros and Taballes.

Bimenes was famous of being a municipality full of miners, even though there were no mines in it, but the surrounding municipalities, Laviana and San Martin del Rey Aurelio did have many of them.

Its medium size surrounding mountains and steep roads are considered for sport events like Vuelta a España, Vuelta a Asturias, and the Rally Príncipe de Asturias.

Politics
The current mayor is Aitor García Corte (Partíu Asturianista).

Parishes
 San Emeterio (Bimenes)
 San Julián (Bimenes)
 Suares

References

Municipalities in Asturias